Adad-nirari or Adad-narari may refer to one of the following ancient Near Eastern kings.

Adad-nirari I of Assyria
Adad-nirari II of Assyria
Adad-nirari III of Assyria
Adad-Nirari of Qatna
Adad-Nirari of Nuhašše